Valeri Gurjua was Head of Abkhazia's Arbitration Court from its founding in 1996 until 1 February 2013, when he was granted resignation due to reaching the age limit of 65 years. He was also a member of the First Convocation of the People's Assembly (1992–1996).

References

1st convocation of the People's Assembly of Abkhazia
Judges from Abkhazia
Living people
Year of birth missing (living people)